Argalus Waldo Starks (March 10, 1804June 28, 1870) was an American farmer, politician, and Wisconsin pioneer.  He served as the 3rd State Prison Commissioner of Wisconsin and later served 6 years in the Wisconsin Legislature, representing Sauk County.

Biography

Born in Williamsburg, Massachusetts, Starks lived in Jefferson County, New York, and then in Albany, New York.  He served on the Albany City Council while living in Albany, New York.

He moved to Milwaukee, Wisconsin Territory, around 1840, and began operating a stage coach line from Milwaukee to Watertown.  He became involved with the Democratic Party organization in Milwaukee and was appointed City Marshall, and was nominated for Sheriff of Milwaukee County, but was not elected.

In the late 1840s, he supported the Free Soil Party, but ultimately returned to the Democratic Party.  He moved to Sauk County in 1852, and in 1853 he was chosen as the Democratic nominee for the new office of State Prison Commissioner.  Prior to 1853, the state had a board of prison commissioners appointed by the Governor; an 1853 law established the elected position of State Prison Commissioner, which office was temporarily held by an appointee of the Governor until the Fall general election of 1853.

His main opponent in the 1853 election was Free Soil candidate Sherman M. Booth, who would—the following year—become famous for his effort to free Joshua Glover in defiance of federal fugitive slave laws.

Starks won the election and was regarded as a fair and honest officeholder—in contrast to Governor William A. Barstow and other state officials of his time, who were implicated in a major bribery investigation.  Starks was seen as refusing that influence, and came under attack from Governor Barstow and his allies.

Starks did not run for re-election in 1855, and instead returned to his farm in Sauk County.  After the outbreak of the American Civil War, however, Starks chose to re-enter politics as a Union Democrat, and remained aligned with the National Union ticket throughout the war.  He was elected to four terms in the Wisconsin State Assembly and one two-year term in the Wisconsin State Senate, running on the Union ticket.  He remained a Republican after the war, but died in 1870 of a kidney disease.

Family
In one biography, he is described as a descendant—possibly a grandson—of American Revolutionary War general John Stark, but it's unclear if that's correct.

During the Civil War, his son, John Starks, served as a sergeant in Company A, 6th Wisconsin Infantry Regiment, Iron Brigade, and was badly wounded in their first major battle at Gainesville, Virginia.  After recuperating, he was commissioned as first lieutenant of Company I, 23rd Wisconsin Infantry Regiment, and was later promoted to captain of Company K in the same regiment.  He was wounded again at the Siege of Vicksburg, and died of complications from this wound two years later.

Electoral history

Wisconsin Prison Commissioner (1853)

| colspan="6" style="text-align:center;background-color: #e9e9e9;"| General Election, November 8, 1853

References

|-

1804 births
1870 deaths
People from Williamsburg, Massachusetts
Politicians from Albany, New York
Politicians from Milwaukee
People from Sauk County, Wisconsin
Wisconsin Democrats
New York (state) city council members
Wisconsin state senators
19th-century American politicians
Republican Party members of the Wisconsin State Assembly